Ammoecius is a genus of scarab beetles in the family Scarabaeidae. There are at least 20 described species in Ammoecius, found in Europe, Asia, and Africa.

Species
These 20 species belong to the genus Ammoecius. Many of these species have been transferred from the genus Aphodius.

 Ammoecius amplicollis (Peyerimhoff, 1949)
 Ammoecius brevis Erichson, 1848
 Ammoecius dentatus Schmidt, 1908
 Ammoecius dogueti (Baraud, 1980)
 Ammoecius elevatus (Olivier, 1789)
 Ammoecius eli (Petrovitz, 1961)
 Ammoecius felscheanus Reitter, 1904
 Ammoecius franzi (Petrovitz, 1964)
 Ammoecius frigidus Brisout, 1866
 Ammoecius incultus (Petrovitz, 1961)
 Ammoecius lugubris (Boheman, 1857)
 Ammoecius lusitanicus Erichson, 1848
 Ammoecius meurguesae Clement, 1975
 Ammoecius mimus (Péringuey, 1901)
 Ammoecius muchei (Petrovitz, 1963)
 Ammoecius naviauxi (Baraud, 1971)
 Ammoecius numidicus Mulsant, 1851
 Ammoecius rugifrons Aube, 1850
 Ammoecius satanas (Carpaneto, 1976)
 Ammoecius terminatus Harold, 1869

References

Scarabaeidae
Scarabaeidae genera